Sheila Chepkirui Kiprotich (born 27 December 1990) is a Kenyan middle- and long-distance runner who competed earlier mainly in the 1500 metres and 5000 metres. She won the bronze medal in the 10,000 metres at the 2022 Commonwealth Games. Chepkirui was the 5000 m 2016 African champion, setting the championship record.

As of September 2022, she placed fourth in the 10 km road race on the world all-time list.

Career
In her youth, Sheila Chepkirui competed in age category competitions. She defeated Yuriko Kobayashi over 1500 m at the 2005 World Youth Championships in Athletics to claim her first international gold medal. Her finishing time of in a 4:12.29 minutes was a championship record. She returned to defend her title two years later, but ended up as bronze medallist at the 2007 event. She failed to improve at the 2008 World Junior Championships in Athletics and did not get past the heats. She dropped out of the sport after that year.

Chepkirui joined up with Kenya Defence Forces and began competing at their track competitions again around 2012. She returned to top level competition in late 2015. Good performances at national cross country running meets culminated in her finishing third at the Kenyan Cross Country Championships. She was chosen for the 2016 African Cross Country Championships and in her senior debut she took the silver medal as part of a Kenyan podium sweep with Alice Aprot and Beatrice Mutai. Later that year she won the 5000 m at the Kenyan Athletics Championships, and won her first senior title competing in the event at the 2016 African Championships in Athletics, setting a championship record of 15:05.45 minutes.

In September 2022, she came close to the women-only 10 kilometres world record at the Brașov Running Festival in Brașov, Romania. With her time of 30:07 Chepkirui, who set her 29:46 personal best in a mixed race in Valencia in 2020, broke the Romanian all-comers's record by more than two minutes, and was only six seconds off the women-only world record.

International competitions

National titles
Kenyan Athletics Championships
5000 metres: 2016, 2019

References

External links

Living people
1990 births
Kenyan female middle-distance runners
Kenyan female long-distance runners
Athletes (track and field) at the 2022 Commonwealth Games
Commonwealth Games bronze medallists for Kenya
Commonwealth Games medallists in athletics
20th-century Kenyan women
21st-century Kenyan women
Medallists at the 2022 Commonwealth Games